The Saryu Yamuna Express is an Express train belonging to Northern Railway zone that runs between  and  in India. It is currently being operated with 14649/14650 train numbers on tri-weekly basis.

Service

The 14649/Saryu Yamuna Express has an average speed of 41 km/hr and covers 1671 km in 40h 40m. The 14650/Saryu Yamuna Express has an average speed of 45 km/hr and covers 1671 km in 37h 20m.

Route and halts 

The important halts of the train are:

Coach composition

The train has standard ICF rakes with max speed of 110 kmph. The train consists of 20 coaches:

 1 AC II Tier
 1 AC III Tier
 7 Sleeper coaches
 9 General
 2 Seating cum Luggage Rake

Schedule

Traction

Both trains are hauled by a Ghaziabad Loco Shed-based WAP-7 or WAP-4 electric locomotive from Jaynagar to Amritsar, and vice versa.

Rake sharing
14673/14674 – Shaheed Express

Direction reversal

The train reverses its direction 3 times:
 Shahganj railway station

See also 

 Jaynagar railway station
 Amritsar Junction railway station
 Shaheed Express

Notes

References

External links 

 14649/Saryu Yamuna Express
 14650/Saryu Yamuna Express

Transport in Amritsar
Transport in Jainagar
Named passenger trains of India
Rail transport in Bihar
Rail transport in Uttar Pradesh
Rail transport in Haryana
Rail transport in Delhi
Rail transport in Punjab, India
Railway services introduced in 2015
2015 establishments in India
Express trains in India